Petifu is a rural town in Port Loko District in the Northern Province of Sierra Leone. Petifu lies about 20 miles to Lungi. The town population is predominantly from the Susu, Temne and Fula ethnic group. The town is predominantly muslim.

History
Petifu was founded by Susu and Fula migrants from present day Guinea. They arrived in that part of Sierra Leone during the 17th century. The Fula and Susu met the Temne people who were already living in the town. These three group live together and gave the name Petifu, made up from two of the three languages Susu and Temne -" Pet"  which means a place outside the bush in Temne language and "Fu" means new in Susu language.

References

Populated places in Sierra Leone